Banijay (formerly Banijay Entertainment and later Banijay Group) is a French television production and distribution company which is the world's largest international content producer and distributor with over 120 production companies across 22 territories, and a multi-genre catalogue containing over 120,000 hours of original programming. Headquartered in Paris, the company was founded in January 2008 by Stéphane Courbit, formerly president of Endemol France, and has risen since its inception, to become a €3bn turnover business. It is currently a subsidiary of FL Entertainment N.V., based in Amsterdam.

The company has expanded over the years through multiple acquisitions, including its purchases of Zodiak Media in 2016 and Endemol Shine Group in 2020, when it adopted its current name.

The group represents some of the world's most renowned non-scripted television formats including Big Brother, Survivor, Deal or No Deal,  Temptation Island, MasterChef, Don't Forget the Lyrics and Hunted.

History 
In 2009, Banijay acquired 51% of Spanish production company Cuarzo Producciones on 12 January, 50% of German producer Brainpool TV on 2 July and the entire television division of Copenhagen-based film studio Nordisk Film on 12 October. In March 2010, Banijay acquired American production company Bunim/Murray Productions for an undisclosed amount.

In September 2012, Banijay acquired a majority stake in Australian production company Screentime, which included a New Zealand division (Screentime New Zealand) and a 49% stake in Irish producer Shinawil which was sold in 2015. That same year, French celebrity channel Non Stop People and Cyril Hanouna's  became new members of the Group, followed in 2013 by Italian producer Ambra Multimedia and Spanish producer, DLO Producciones.

In April 2014, Banijay launched Banijay Studios North America in Los Angeles, California. On 9 January 2015, Banijay acquired New York City-based Stephen David Entertainment.

In July 2015, Banijay Group announced that it would merge with Zodiak Media; the merger was completed in February 2016. Vivendi also became a shareholder in 2016.

In 2017, Banijay acquired BlackLight Television, Blast and Fearless Minds in the UK, launched YellowBird UK and acquired Shauna Events in France. In July of that year, Banijay announced it had acquired Survivor production company Castaway Television Productions.

In February 2018, Banijay Group acquired Britain-based company Wonder and Neon Ink Productions in February Banijay Studios Italy, Banijay Asia and Banijay Productions Germany were created in June of that year. Portocabo and Terence Films also became members of the group in 2018.

In October 2018, Banijay entered advanced talks to acquire rival Endemol Shine Group, with a deal approved a year later on 26 October 2019.

In October 2019, Good Times and Funwood Media became part of the group and the company launched joint venture The Natural Studios alongside Bear Grylls and Delbert Shoopman.

On 30 June 2020, the European Commission approved Banijay's purchase of Endemol Shine. The purchase was completed on July 3, 2020, whereby Banijay took on its current name (dropping off "Group") and upscaled from its 16 territories to 22. More recently, it signed a deal with Nineteen11, a production company. On December 15, 2021, Banijay Rights inked a deal with Viaplay which provided access to its Nordic drama titles. This led to the creation of Banijay Brands and in September 2020 Banijay Germany secured the majority stake in SR Management GmbH.
 
In April 2021 it was announced Banijay acquired animation company Monello Productions to sit under Banijay Kids & Family. In addition, that month, Banijay Germany launched a new label before announcing in May that Banijay Germany had established a new documentary division. In June of the same year Endemol Shine Germany, part of Banijay Germany, had launched Rainer Laux Productions which is a collaboration with renowned TV producer Rainer Laux. Banijay Germany also partnered with Stephan Denzer in October to found fiction label Good Humor.

In 2021, Marathon Studio, a joint venture with Banijay France was established and it was announced in July that Banijay France acquired DMLS TV. In July new French talent agency, Banijay Talent and IMA the new creative agency from Banijay Iberia were launched. Additionally, Banijay Benelux acquired a majority stake in leading Dutch sports producer Southfields.

In September 2021, Banijay Americas launched new production studio Banijay Mexico & U.S. Hispanic, which is based in Mexico City and Los Angeles.  Banijay UK also announced in October 2021 the creation of new scripted start-up Double Dutch.

In February 2022, Endemol Shine Boomdog, announced the launch of its post-production studio. This month also saw the creation of Yasuke Production. This new production company between Endemol France and Teddy Riner will focus on the world of sport. Later this month, a partnership with award-winning French producer Alain Goldman via Pitchipoï Productions and Montmartre Films was confirmed.

In March 2022, it was announced that Banijay had acquired the Rome-based production company, Grøenlandia Group.

In April Banijay, announced it is further growing its premium scripted offering via a partnership between Banijay Iberia and Pokeepsie Films.

In May 2022, it was announced that Banijay will be public through an agreement with a SPAC investment group.

In July 2022, it was announced that Banijay would acquire the Sony-owned German television production company, Sony Pictures Television Germany. The acquisition was completed in October 2022, with the company renamed as Noisy Pictures.

In October 2022, it was announced that Banijay had entered into a Scheme Implementation Deed (Scheme) to acquire Beyond International. Also in the month, it was announced that Banijay UK had acquired Mam Tor Productions.

In December 2022, Banijay acquired Brazilian studio A Fábrica.

Programmes 

Banijay has several brands of television programmes and formats aimed at different demographics. Some of its better-known programmes and formats produced by its many subsidiaries (past and present) are:

 5 Million Money Drop
 Aarya
 All Together Now
 Beauty and the Geek
 Beforeigners
 Big Brother
 Bigg Boss
 The Biggest Loser
 Black Mirror
 The Bridge
 The Courtship
 Deadly Women
 Deal or No Deal
 Domina
 Domino Challenge
 Don't Forget the Lyrics
 Drag Race France
 Fear Factor
 Fort Boyard
 Grantchester
 Hunted
 The Island with Bear Grylls
 Keeping Up with the Kardashians
 Language of Love
 LEGO Masters
 Limitless Win
 Lost in Oz 
 Marie Antoinette
 MasterChef
 Motown Magic
 Mr. Bean
 MythBusters
 Peaky Blinders
 Pointless
 Popstars
 SAS: Rogue Heroes
 Simon's Cat
 Starstruck
 Survivor
 Totally Spies!
 The Wall
 Wipeout
 Would I Lie to You?
 Your Face Sounds Familiar

Assets 
Assets owned by Banijay include:

References

External links 
 

 
Companies based in Paris
Mass media in Paris
Entertainment companies of France
Television production companies of France
Mass media companies established in 2008
French companies established in 2008